The Smith's shrew (Chodsigoa smithii) is a species of mammal in the family Soricidae. It is endemic to southwest China, living primarily in mountainous broad-leaved forests at elevations of 900–3000 meters.

References

Red-toothed shrews
Mammals of China
Taxonomy articles created by Polbot
Mammals described in 1911
Taxa named by Oldfield Thomas